Mukim Sukang is a mukim in Belait District, Brunei. The population was 169 in 2016.

Geography 
The mukim is located in the interior part of Belait District. It borders Mukim Bukit Sawat to the north, Mukim Rambai of Tutong District to the north-east, the Malaysian state of Sarawak to the east and south-east, Mukim Melilas to the south and Mukim Labi to the west.

Demographics 
As of 2016 census, the population of Mukim Sukang comprised 87 males and 82 females. The mukim had 36 households occupying 20 dwellings. The entire population lived in rural areas.

Villages 
As of 2016, Mukim Sukang comprises the following populated villages:

References 

Sukang
Belait District